Grimsby station is a railway station in Grimsby, Ontario, Canada. It is served by the Maple Leaf train between Toronto and New York City.

The Maple Leaf is a joint Amtrak–Via Rail service: ticketing is shared, and trains consist of Amtrak equipment but are operated on the Toronto–Niagara Falls portion of the route by Via crews. The station was formerly served by additional Via trains operating as part of Corridor services, but these were discontinued in 2012.

The station is an accessible, unstaffed, but heated shelter beside the tracks replaced a small wooden shed. Parking is free.

History

Original station (1853)

The original Great Western Railway station, built in 1853, was moved further back from the tracks in the late 1800s, is unoccupied as of early 2021 and was most recently used by the Fork Road Pottery from 1997 until 2018. It had also been used previously as a fruit depot and meat packing depot.

Other buildings

The second GWR station burned down in 1900 and was replaced by a third in 1902.  That historic railway station building had two towers and was destroyed by an electrical fire in 1994. That building was concurrently in use as a restaurant between 1979 and 1994. The current Via Rail shelter was built in the 1990s.

See also 
Grimsby GO Station

References

External links

Grimsby Via Rail Station(Canada RailGuide—TrainWeb)

Via Rail stations in Ontario
Amtrak stations in Canada
Railway stations in Canada opened in 1902
Rail transport in Grimsby, Ontario
Railway stations in the Regional Municipality of Niagara
Grand Trunk Railway stations in Ontario